Janardhan Reddy may refer to:

 Gali Janardhan Reddy, Karnataka legislator and minister
 Nagam Janardhan Reddy, legislator from Andhra Pradesh
 Nedurumalli Janardhana Reddy, former Chief Minister and MP from Andhra Pradesh
 P. Janardhan Reddy, former legislator from Andhra Pradesh